Mary Eunice McCarthy (March 4, 1899 – August 7, 1969) was an American screenwriter, playwright, journalist and author, perhaps best known today as the screenwriter of, and driving force behind, the biopic Sister Kenny (1946).

Biography

Beginnings 
One of 13 children born to John Henry McCarty and Catherine Elizabeth Theresa Lynch, Mary graduated from Star of the Sea Parish High School in 1917. She then attended College of the Holy Names before embarking on a career as a journalist in the Bay Area. One of her positions in the early 1920s was as a reporter at The San Francisco Bulletin.

Hollywood career 
Around 1921, McCarthy followed her brothers to Hollywood, where she worked at an advertising agency while trying to teach herself the fundamentals of screenwriting. Between 1925 and 1957, she wrote a number of films and at least two stage plays—the latter of which also featured the playwright, under her married name Mary Boyle, in the lead role. During this period, McCarthy lived in Los Angeles but frequently traveled to San Francisco for work. McCarthy also wrote two nonfiction books: Hands of Hollywood was published in 1929, while Meet Kitty (a memoir about her mother) was published in 1957. That same year, both Matinee Theater and O. Henry Playhouse featured new McCarthy teleplays.

In 1939, a syndicated profile/interview highlighted McCarthy's "pet dislike at present," paraphrased by UP's Alex Kahn as "the so-called Hollywood 'Intellectuals' who, she says, try so hard to be different and become so utterly confused." Quoted directly, McCarthy continues:

Aside from foreshadowing the anti-message 'message' of Preston Sturges's Sullivan's Travels, McCarthy's gripe also sheds light on a script she had recently completed and another she would soon begin, namely Irish Luck (1939) and Chasing Trouble (1940), vehicles designed for the newly minted, interracial comic team of Mantan Moreland and Frankie Darro (the latter having previously been singled out for praise in McCarthy's Hands of Hollywood). Despite playing the duo's nominal leader, Darro's leadership is typically so compromised by harebrained schemes and arcane, questionable methodology—in effect, "try[ing] so hard to be different"—that he can scarcely help but "become utterly confused." Moreover, while it is unclear to what extent, if any, she herself was responsible for the Moreland-Darro pairing, the following excerpts from McCarthy's 1957 biography of her mother provides a useful reference point, regarding "the fundamentals of American life" as practiced and preached in the McCarty/McCarthy household.

Reviewing Meet Kitty for The New York Times, Ernestine Gilbreth Carey wrote:

In October 1958, McCarthy would briefly resume her journalistic career as author of a weekly column published in the West Los Angeles Independent. It ran for a little under three years and was entitled simply "Mary McCarthy's Column". But, as her new employer noted prior to the column's debut, "Anything more pretentious would offend Mary Eunice McCarthy."

Personal life 
She had two brothers who were writer-directors in the industry: John P. McCarthy and Henry McCarty. Another brother, Francis Joseph McCarty, built one of the first radiotelephone sets in 1902, but died in a road accident in 1906. From January 1922 until at least July 1931, McCarthy was married to Edward G. Boyle, a set decorator.

In the weeks leading up to the 1928 presidential election, McCarthy—dubbed "the Joan of Arc of the Democratic Party"—harshly criticized the Hoover presidency and campaigned on behalf of his Democratic opponent, Al Smith.

The dedicatee of her 1929 film-making guide, Hands of Hollywood, was longtime friend and colleague Lucy Beaumont, who had starred in at least two McCarthy-scripted films.

Selected filmography
 Hill Folk (aka Savage Passions) (1926)
 The Fighting Failure (1926) 
 Slightly Married (1932, as Mary McCarthy)
 Ships of Chance (1932, never filmed)
 Woman Unafraid (1934, story and screenplay)
 I Hate Women (1934, screenplay)
 Life Returns (1934, additional dialogue; as Mary McCarthy)
 Theodora Goes Wild (1935, story; as Mary McCarthy)
 Irish Luck (1939, as Mary McCarthy)
 Chasing Trouble (1940, as Mary McCarthy)
 Sister Kenny (1946, as Mary McCarthy)
 Curley (1947, additional dialogue; as Mary McCarthy)
 The Petty Girl (1950, story; as Mary McCarthy)

References

Further reading 
 McCarthy, Mary Eunice (November 1917, Vol. 5, No. 11). "A Cross in the Sand". Franciscan Herald. pp.416–419
 McCarthy, Mary Eunice (December 1918, Vol. 6, No. 12). "The One Way". Franciscan Herald. pp.478–482
 "'Women's Place' to Be Topic of Lecture". The Fresno Morning Republican. March 12, 1920. p. 18
 "Writers Present Own Productions". Hollywood Daily Citizen. April 4, 1925. p. 3
 "Woman Speaker Will Appear for Film Industry". The Oakland Tribune. April 8, 1928
 Wilk, Ralph (November 9, 1933). "A 'Little' from Hollywood 'Lots'". The Film Daily. p. 6
 McCarthy, Mary (1934). "Were There Movies in Eden?". The Screenwriter's Magazine. p. 1 
 Special to the Times (November 28, 1936). "Screen Writer Arrives at Mills". The San Mateo Times.
 Safford, Virginia (November 2, 1943). "Names Make News". The Minneapolis Star. p. 17
 Coons, Robbin (January 13, 1944). "Sister Kenny Gets Movie Treatment; Film Will Portray Her Work With Infantile Paralysis". Macon Chronicle-Herald. p. 2
 "Indian's Love on Matinee". The Paducah Sun. August 25, 1957. p. 38
 Hanrahan, Virginia (November 23, 1957). "The Literary Grapevine". The Napa Valley Register. p. 18
 Cohn, Victor (February 10, 1954). "The Story of Sister Kenny: Seven Questions at Party Tested Nurse's Character". pp. 1-A, 10-A
 Hurley, Dorian (January 1958). "Book Reviews: Meet Kitty". The Sign. p. 64
 Hertzel, Leo G. (March 1958). "Book Reviews: Meet Kitty". The Catholic Educator. pp. 467–469
 "'Cycle Rider Hurt Severely in Crash". Valley News. October 11, 1964. p. 37

Books
 Masterson, James; Eberly, Joyce E., editors (1959) Writings on American History, 1957; Volume II of the Annual Report of the American Historical Association for the Year 1959. Washington, DC : U.S. Government Printing Office. 1959. p. 529

External links 

 The feature films Irish Luck (1939), Chasing Trouble (1940), Sister Kenny (1946) are available for free download at Internet Archive.

1899 births
1969 deaths
American women dramatists and playwrights
American women screenwriters
Screenwriters from California
People from the San Francisco Bay Area
Holy Names University alumni
20th-century American dramatists and playwrights
20th-century American women writers
20th-century American screenwriters